Amanda Chick (born October 17, 2001) is an American professional stock car racing driver who competes full-time in the ARCA Menards Series and part-time in the ARCA Menards Series East and West, driving the No. 74 Chevrolet SS for her family-owned team, Team Chick Motorsports.

Racing career
Chick first began her racing career after completing ten laps at a quarter-midget track in Topeka, Kansas when she was six. She then became a champion in the TKQMA Honda Jr. championship in the Honda and Stock divisions in 2010 before finishing in the top five in the standings in the USAC Generation Series in 2012 and 2013.

In 2017, Chick would run six races in the CRA JEGS All Star Tour, where she would finish in the top ten in three races. She would run the majority of the races the following year, and finished fourth in the points with three top tens. In 2019, she would finish second in the points with seven top-10's, including a top five at Bristol Motor Speedway. She would compete in eight of the ten races in 2020, finishing in the top-ten three times before running only five races the following year.

In 2022, Chick would make her ARCA Menards Series debut at Lucas Oil Indianapolis Raceway Park, driving the No. 74 Toyota for Team Chick Motorsports using equipment bought from Visconti Motorsports. After starting 16th, she would finish 18th due to a crash. She would make another start at Milwaukee Mile, where she would finish three laps down in 16th after starting 14th.

Chick opened the 2023 ARCA Menards Series season at Daytona International Speedway with a fifth-place finish.

Personal life
Chick is the daughter of former NASCAR Craftsman Truck Series owner Steve Chick Jr., who had fielded entries in the series from 2001 to 2006.

Chick is currently an engineering student at Rose-Hulman Institute of Technology.

Motorsports career results

ARCA Menards Series
(key) (Bold – Pole position awarded by qualifying time. Italics – Pole position earned by points standings or practice time. * – Most laps led.)

ARCA Menards Series East

ARCA Menards Series West

References

Living people
2001 births
NASCAR drivers
ARCA Menards Series drivers
American female racing drivers
Racing drivers from Kansas
People from De Soto, Kansas